The Joint Precision Airdrop System (JPADS) is an American military airdrop system which uses the Global Positioning System (GPS), steerable parachutes, and an onboard computer to steer loads to a designated point of impact (PI) on a drop zone (DZ). The JPADS family of systems consists of several precision airdrop systems, ranging from extra light to heavy payloads. JPADS is used in conjunction with mission planning software that resides on a laptop.  The function of this mission planning software includes computing release points, weather forecasting, acquiring measurements of wind velocity, altitude, air pressure, and temperature. It can also receive weather updates and en route mission changes through satellite links.

History

U.S. Army Research, Development and Engineering Command (RDECOM) was the primary developer for JPADS, which meets several requirements: increased ground accuracy, standoff delivery, increased air carrier survivability, and improved effectiveness/assessment feedback regarding airdrop mission operations. The U.S. Army and U.S. Air Force began jointly developing this system in 1993. The U.S. Air Force made its first operational/combat use of the system in Afghanistan in 2006.

Operation

The steerable parachute or parafoil is called a "decelerator," and gives the JPADS system directional control throughout its descent by means of decelerator steering lines attached to the Autonomous Guidance Unit (AGU).  They create drag on either side of the decelerator, which turns the parachute, thus achieving directional control.

The AGU contains a GPS, a battery pack, and the guidance, navigation and control (GN&C) software package.  It also houses the hardware required to operate the steering lines.  The AGU obtains its position prior to exiting the aircraft, and continues to calculate its position via the GPS throughout descent.  

The Mission Planner software gives the aircrew the ability to plan the mission, in flight if necessary, as well as steer the aircraft to its Computed Air Release Point (CARP), where the load is released.

Increments
JPADS involves four increments, categorized by the weight of the cargo to be dropped:

Increment I: JPADS-2K / applies to loads up to 2,200 lb / classified as the “extra light” category / commensurate with Container Delivery System (CDS) bundles.

Increment II: JPADS-10K / applies to loads up to 10,000 lb.

Increment III: JPADS-30K / applies to loads up to 30,000 lb.

Increment IV: JPADS-60K / applies to loads up to 60,000 lb.

Accuracy

This reduces both the risk of hostile fire to aircraft and aircrews and the amount of cargo that misses a drop zone.

Benefits
JPADS offers several main benefits, including an increase in the number of available drop zones and an increase in the cargo's precision, which benefits the user.  JPADS also increases the survivability of the delivery aircraft and its crew.

Ground Accuracy
Current drop zones are quite large;  or more.

JPADs can achieve the same or better accuracy from greater heights, allowing the aircraft to drop the load at a much higher, and usually safer, altitude.

Standoff Delivery
Because JPADS allows the aircraft to drop at high-altitude, the aircraft can actually drop the load a good distance away from the drop zone, which affords the aircrew to remain free of enemy threats which may be near the area where the load is being dropped.

Survivability
Airdrops are usually performed at slow speeds for an aircraft, usually 130 kts for paratroopers and 140 kts for cargo.  When combined with the low altitude required for precision, the aircraft are vulnerable to enemy ground fire.  With JPADS, the aircraft is much more likely to survive, as it can drop at a much higher altitude, above most enemy ground fire.

Feedback
Because the system can transmit its current position back to the airdrop aircraft, it provides its exact landing location which the aircrew can then transmit to ground forces which may not have arrived at the drop zone.

See also

 Delivery drone
 Loadmaster
 Pathfinder (military)
 Airborne forces
 Paratrooper
 Static line
 High-altitude military parachuting

References

External links
 Airborne Systems' JPADS
 Sherpa JPADS System Overview
 Global Security - JPADS
 US Army's NATICK article on JPADS
 Defense Industry Daily article on JPADS
 HAHO/HALO for Parachutists
 Defenselink article with photo
 Defense Update - JPADS The Way Ahead
 DragonFly JPADS 10K enters full-rate production
 How the US pulled off its humanitarian aid missions to the Yazidis
 Combat support and combat service support - Army
 Natick makes resupply from sky possible

Air freight
American military aviation
Global Positioning System